Augustine P. Flynn (1933 – 26 April 2021), known as Austin Flynn, was an Irish hurler. As a player, he was noted in newspaper reports as a "fine hard-tackling but honest player" and "a sturdy sentry on the edge of the square." Flynn had a fifteen-year association with the Waterford senior hurling team and has been described as "one of its greatest defenders."

Career

In the late 1950s and early 1960s, the Waterford senior hurling team rose from obscurity to enjoy a golden age in the sport. Flynn, having earlier lined out at minor level but declined a position on the junior team because of his youth, first played for the team in 1952 but only established himself as first-choice full-back five years later. It was a position he retained for over a decade. After winning the first of three Munster Championship medals in 1957, Flynn went on to claim his sole All-Ireland Championship title after a replay defeat of Kilkenny in 1959. He also won a National League medal in 1963. At club level, Flynn enjoyed a lengthy career playing for Abbeyside in both hurling and Gaelic football. With Munster he won two Railway Cup medals. 

Flynn had a number of personal achievements including three Cú Chulainn awards. He was recognised as his county's greatest full-back when he was picked in that position on the Waterford Hurling Team of the Millennium.

Death

Flynn's death was announced on 27 April 2021.

References

1933 births
2021 deaths
Abbeyside hurlers
Waterford inter-county hurlers
Munster inter-provincial hurlers
All-Ireland Senior Hurling Championship winners